Plestiodon bilineatus, also known as the Mexican shortnose skink, or the two-lined short-nosed skink, is a species of lizard endemic to Mexico.

Description 
P.Bilineatus can reach a snout-to-vent length (SVL) of 60 mm.  Light stripes run down from its head to tail.

Reproduction 
Little is known about the reproduction of P. Bilineatus, though the average litter size of the closely related species P.Lynxe is 2-5 neonates.  Many other species in the genus Plestiodon are viviparous, so it can be assumed that P.Bilineatus reproduces similarly.

Habitat 
The Mexican short-nose skink is endemic to the Pacific Coast and Sierra Madre Occidental pine-oak forests in Durango, Mexico

References

bilineatus
Reptiles of Mexico
Reptiles described in 1958
Taxa named by Wilmer W. Tanner